The Roman Catholic Diocese of Dumka is a suffragan Latin diocese in the Ecclesiastical province of the Metropolitan of Ranchi in India's Jharkhand state.

Its episcopal see is the cathedral of St. Paul in the city of Dumka.

History 
 17 January 1952: Established as the Apostolic Prefecture of Malda on territory split off from the Metropolitan Archdiocese of Calcutta
 8 August 1962: Promoted as Diocese of Dumka
 Lost territory on 8 June 1978 to establish the Roman Catholic Diocese of Raiganj, to which the incumbent bishop moved
 Lost territory on 27 June to establish the Roman Catholic Diocese of Purnea

Ordinaries 
(all Latin, Roman Rite)
 Apostolic Prefect of Malda
 Fr. Adam Grossi, Society of Foreign Missions (P.M.E.) (March 28, 1952 – 1962)

 Bishops of Dumka
 Leo Tigga, Society of Jesus (S.J.) (August 8, 1962 – June 8, 1978), later Bishop of split-off Roman Catholic Diocese of Raiganj (India) (1978.06.08 – 1986.01.29)
 Telesphore Placidus Toppo (June 8, 1978 – November 8, 1984), later Coadjutor Archbishop of Ranchi (India) (1984.11.08 – 1985.08.07), succeeding as Metropolitan Archbishop of Ranchi (1985.08.07 – ...), Vice-President of Conference of Catholic Bishops of India (1998 – 2002), President of Conference of Catholic Bishops of India (2002 – 2005), Cardinal-priest of S. Cuore di Gesù agonizzante a Vitinia (2003.10.21 [2004.05.23] – ...), President of Catholic Bishops’ Conference of India (2004.01.12 – 2008.02.19), Member of Commission of Cardinals overseeing the Institute for Works of Religion (2008.02.24 – 2014.01.15), President of Conference of Catholic Bishops of India (2011.01.12 – 2013.02), Member of Council of Cardinals for the Study of Organisational and Economic Problems of the Apostolic See (2012.06.23 – 2014.02.24)
 Stephen M. Tiru (April 18, 1986 – April 1, 1995), later Bishop of Khunti (India) (1995.04.01 – 2012.03.03)
 Julius Marandi (June 14, 1997 – ...)

References

Sources and external links
 GCatholic.org, with incumbent biography links 
 Catholic Hierarchy 

Roman Catholic dioceses in India
Christian organizations established in 1952
Roman Catholic dioceses and prelatures established in the 20th century
1952 establishments in Bihar
Christianity in Jharkhand
Dumka district